Vladimír Stránský (born 7 June 1947) is a Czech former professional ice hockey player.

Career
Between 1977 and 1981 Stránský played in the Czechoslovak First Ice Hockey League with both HC Vítkovice and HC Zlín.

He won the national title with HC Vítkovice in 1981.

Family
His sons Vít and Vladan also played ice hockey at a high level, the latter representing Australia after playing there for several years.

References

External links

1947 births
Living people
Sportspeople from Jihlava
Czech ice hockey left wingers
HC Vítkovice players
PSG Berani Zlín players
Czechoslovakia (WHA) players
HC Košice players